Corrado Fumagalli (born in Cassano d'Adda, Italy July 27, 1967) is an Italian television presenter.

Career
From 1984 until 1993 he began to djing for various italian radio stations. Before launching his career as a TV presenter he opens in Bergamo several nightclubs that attracted considerable public success. He arrives later to become presenter of the erotic fair MiSex. Completed the collaboration with MiSex since 2007, he organizes BergamoSex, the feast of friends of SexyBar, with great audience and fans.
He produces and hosts the program Sexy bar aired every night since 1999 on several channels throughout Italy and on satellite.
In 2008 he opened 18vm.tv, the first erotic web tv in Italy and in 2010, he developed the idea of creating a free thematic TV channel devoted exclusively to the Internazionale Milano team on digital terrestrial television: InterTV. Fumagalli assumes the role of director with Andrea Bosio as Deputy Director. The broadcasts start officially on September 10.
In December 2012, he released his autobiographical book Alla Grande!.

Bibliography
 Alla Grande! (2012)

References

1967 births
Living people
Italian television presenters
Italian LGBT broadcasters
21st-century LGBT people